The Yai River is a river of Thailand. It is a tributary of the Pa Sak River, part of the Chao Phraya River basin.

See also
Tributaries of the Chao Phraya River

Rivers of Thailand